The 1968 Dallas Cowboys season was their ninth in the league and won the Capitol division by five games with a 12–2 record. In the first round of the playoffs, Dallas met the Cleveland Browns (10–4) in the Eastern Conference title game, held at Municipal Stadium in Cleveland. In this era, the host sites were rotated, home field advantage was not adopted for the playoffs until . Dallas had won the regular season game 28–7 in September, and had routed the Browns 52–14 in the previous year's playoffs, but both were played at the Cotton Bowl.

Cleveland upset the favored Cowboys 31–20, sending Dallas to the third place Playoff Bowl at the Orange Bowl in Miami, where they rallied to defeat the Minnesota Vikings, 17–13.

The team averaged 30.8 points per game during the regular season, and holds the record for most points scored through the first three games of a season.

Offseason

NFL draft

Schedule

Division opponents are in bold text

Game summaries

Week 3

Week 14

Playoffs

Standings

Roster

References

Dallas Cowboys seasons
Dallas Cowboys
Dallas Cowboys